Louise Allen is the pseudonym used by Melanie Hilton (born 1949 in Norfolk, England) a British writer of romance novels since 1993, she started writing in collaboration with a friend under the pen name of Francesca Shaw. Her novels The Piratical Miss Ravenhurst in 2011 and Scandal’s Virgin in 2014 won the Love Story of the Year by the Romantic Novelists' Association.

Biography
Melanie Hilton was born in 1949 in Norfolk, England, United Kingdom. She obtained a degree in geography and archaeology. She lived in Bedfordshire and then moved to Cley on the North Norfolk coast with her husband.

Bibliography

As Francesca Shaw

Single novels
 Master of Winterbourne (1993)
 Miss Weston's Masquerade (1994)
 A Compromised Lady (1995)
 The Unconventional Miss Dane (1997)
 The Admiral's Daughter (1999)
 The Youngest Dowager (2000)
 A Scandalous Lady (2002)
 The Rebellious Bride (2002)
 Lord of Scandal (2007)

Anthologies in collaboration
 The Regency Rakes (Virtuous Cyprian / Unconventional Miss Dane) (2002) (with Nicola Cornick)
 The Regency Rakes (Lady Polly / The Admiral's Daughter) (2003) (with Nicola Cornick)
 Regency Brides Collection (The Youngest Dowager / Master of Tamasee) (2004) (with Helen Dickson)
 The Regency Lords & Ladies Collection (A Scandalous Lady / The Gentleman's Demand) (2005) (with Meg Alexander)
 Regency Brides Bundle (The Rebellious Bride / The Viscount's Bride / The Penniless Bride) (2007) (with Nicola Cornick and Ann Elizabeth Cree)
 The Regency Lords & Ladies Collection (Duke's Mistress / The Rebellious Bride) (2008) (with Ann Elizabeth Cree)

As Louise Allen

Single novels
 One Night with a Rake (2003)
 The Earl's Intended Wife (2004)
 The Society Catch (2004)
 A Model Débutante (2005)
 The Marriage Debt (2005)
 Moonlight and Mistletoe (2005)
 The Viscount's Betrothal (2006)
 The Bride's Seduction (2006)
 Not Quite a Lady (2006)
 A Most Unconventional Courtship (2007)
 No Place for a Lady (2007)
 Virgin Slave, Barbarian King (2007)

Novellas
 A Mistletoe Masquerade (2008)

Those Scandalous Ravenhursts Series
 The Dangerous Mr Ryder (2008)
 The Outrageous Lady Felsham (2008)
 The Shocking Lord Standon (2008)
 The Disgraceful Mr Ravenhurst (2009)
 The Notorious Mr Hurst (2009)
 The Piratical Miss Ravenhurst (2009)
 The Mutinous Miss Ravenhurst (2010)

The Transformation of the Shelley Sisters Series
 Practical Widow to Passionate Mistress (2010)
 Vicar's Daughter to Viscount's Lady (2010)
 Innocent Courtesan to Adventurer's Bride (2010)

Danger & Desire Series
 Ravished by the Rake (2011)
 Seduced by the Scoundrel (2011)
 Married to a Stranger (2011)

Lords of Disgrace Series
 His Housekeeper's Christmas Wish (2015)
 His Christmas Countess (2015)
 The Many Sins of Chris de Faux (2016)
 The Unexpected Marriage of Gabriel Stone (2016)

Herriad Series
 Forbidden Jewel of India (2012)
 Tarnished Amongst the Ton (2013)
 Surrender to the Marquis (2017)

Dangerous Deceptions Series
 Loving the Lost Duke (2017)
 The Swordmaster's Mistress (2017)
 The Viscount's Dangerous Liaison (2018)

Time into Time Series
 An Earl Out of Time (2017)
 A Kiss Across Time (2018)

Silk & Scandal Series Multi-Author
1. The Lord and the Wayward Lady (2010)
7. The Officer and the Proper Lady (2010)

Omnibus
 A Model Débutante / The Marriage Debt / Moonlight and Mistletoe (2006)
 Regency Pleasures (A Model Débutante / The Marriage Debt) (2011)

Anthologies in collaboration
 Christmas Brides (The Greek's Christmas Baby / Moonlight and Mistletoe) (2005) (with Lucy Monroe)
 Hot Desert Nights (Mistress To A Sheikh / Desert Rake / Blackmailed By The Sheikh) (2007) (with Kim Lawrence and Lucy Monroe)
 Dutiful Rake / One Night with a Rake (2008) (with Elizabeth Rolls)
 Married by Christmas (Silent Night Man / Christmas Reunion / A Mistletoe Masquerade) (2008) (with Catherine George and Diana Palmer)
 Silent Night Man / Christmas Reunion / Mistletoe Masquerade (2008) (with Catherine George and Diana Palmer)
 Sparhawk's Lady / Earl's Intended Wife (2009) (with Miranda Jarrett)
 Together by Christmas (The Unmasking of Lady Loveless / Christmas Reunion / A Mistletoe Masquerade) (2009) (with vNicola Cornick and Catherine George)
 Pleasurably Undone! (Seducing a Stranger / The Viking's Forbidden Love-Slave / Disrobed and Dishonored / A Night for Her Pleasure / The Unlacing of Miss Leigh) (2010) (with Terri Brisbin, Diane Gaston, Christine Merrill and Michelle Willingham)
 Wicked Regency Nights (The Unmasking of Lady Loveless / Disrobed and Dishonoured / Libertine Lord, Pickpocket Miss / The Unlacing of Miss Leigh / Notorious Lord, Compromised Miss) (2010) (with Annie Burrows, Nicola Cornick, Diane Gaston and Bronwyn Scott)
 Snowbound Wedding Wishes (An Earl Beneath the Mistletoe / Twelfth Night Proposal / Christmas at Oakhurst Manor) (2012) (with Lucy Ashford and Joanna Fulford)

References and Resources

1949 births
Living people
People from Cley next the Sea
20th-century English novelists
21st-century English novelists
English romantic fiction writers
RoNA Award winners
Women romantic fiction writers
English women novelists
21st-century English women writers
20th-century English women writers
People from Bedfordshire
Pseudonymous women writers
20th-century pseudonymous writers
21st-century pseudonymous writers